Rui Araújo (25 March 1910 – 8 January 1998 ) was a Portuguese footballer who played as midfielder.

References

External links 
 
 

1910 births
Portuguese footballers
Association football midfielders
Primeira Liga players
Sporting CP footballers
Portugal international footballers
1998 deaths